Arslanyaylası is a village in the District of Söke, Aydın Province, Turkey. As of 2010, it had a population of 181 people.

References

Villages in Söke District